Neville Wittey (born 4 September 1957 Melbourne) is a sailor from Australia, who represented his country at the 2000 Summer Olympics in Sydney, Australia as helmsman in the Soling. With crew members Josh Grace and David Edwards they took the 8th place.

References

1957 births
Living people
Sailors at the 2000 Summer Olympics – Soling
Olympic sailors of Australia
Sportspeople from Melbourne
Australian male sailors (sport)